Caston is a village and civil parish in the English of Norfolk.

History
Caston's name is of Anglo-Saxon origin and derives from the Old English for "Catt's farmstead or settlement".

In the Domesday Book, Caston is recorded as a settlement of 56 households in the hundred of Wayland. The village was divided between the estates of King William and William de Warenne.

The remains of a fifteenth century stone cross are mounted on the village green, this monument was originally larger and more ornately carved until it was smashed by Puritans during the seventeenth century.

During the sixteenth century, Caston was the residence of Edward Gilman, who was one of the earliest recorded ancestors of Abraham Lincoln.

Caston Windmill was built in the nineteenth century for Edward Wyer. Today, the mill is in private ownership and is Grade II listed.

Geography
According to the 2011 Census, Caston has a population of 443 residents living in 189 households.

Caston is located in the constituency of Mid Norfolk and is thus represented by George Freeman MP in Parliament.

Holy Cross Church
Caston's Holy Cross is of Norman origin and was heavily restored during the fourteenth century.

War Memorial
Caston's War Memorial is located in the centre of the village green and takes the form of a stone Celtic cross. It lists the following names for the First World War:
 Second-Lieutenant Frederick C. Corley (1887-1918), 8th Battalion, Border Regiment
 Sergeant Edgar Hannant (1886-1917), 1st Battalion, Royal Norfolk Regiment
 Corporal Horace Tye (1888-1917), 13th Battalion, Essex Regiment
 Lance-Corporal Herbert Cooper (d.1917), 108th Company, Machine Gun Corps
 Private Leonard A. Tye (1896-1917), 7th Battalion, Bedfordshire Regiment
 Private Robert W. Reynolds (1893-1916), 8th (Winnipeg Rifles) Battalion, Canadian Army
 Private Reginald W. Partridge (1883-1915), 16th (Canadian Scottish) Battalion, Canadian Army
 Private John H. Lawes (1899-1918), 8th Battalion, Gloucestershire Regiment
 Private Richard Hannant (1871-1915), 8th Battalion, Middlesex Regiment
 Private Harry Cator (1892-1917), 1/5th Battalion, Royal Norfolk Regiment
 Private Harry Green (1877-1916), 8th Battalion, Royal Norfolk Regiment
 Private Edward J. Hunt (1887-1917), 9th Battalion, Royal Norfolk Regiment
 Private George W. Anthony (1991-1917), 4th Battalion, Northumberland Fusiliers
 Private Albert E. Reynolds (1897-1917), 5th Battalion, Northumberland Fusiliers
 Sapper James T. Bambridge (1878-1916), 4th (Provisional) Company, Royal Engineers

And, the following for the Second World War:
 Leading-Aircraftman Robert G. Curtis (1919-1945), Royal Air Force
 Gunner Reginald J. Lawes (1911-1943), 65th (Field) Regiment, Royal Artillery
 Yeoman Frederick H. Thorpe MiD (1909-1942), HMS Cleopatra

References

External links

Villages in Norfolk
Lincoln family
Civil parishes in Norfolk
Breckland District